Go Soeda won the first edition of this tournament, defeating Raven Klaasen 7–5, 6–4 in the final.

Seeds

Draw

Finals

Top half

Bottom half

References
 Main Draw
 Qualifying Draw

ATP China Challenger International - Singles
2011 Singles